Read School may refer to:

Read School, Drax, a British public school
Read School (Coventry, Rhode Island), a historic schoolhouse, listed on the National Register of Historic Places (NRHP)
Read School (Oshkosh, Wisconsin), listed on the NRHP in Winnebago County, Wisconsin
Thomas Buchanan Read School, Philadelphia, Pennsylvania, listed on the NRHP in Southwest Philadelphia

See also
Read House (disambiguation)